Siow Yi Ting (born 11 December 1985 in Negeri Sembilan, Malaysia) was an Olympic and national record holding breaststroke swimmer from Malaysia. She swam for Malaysia at the 2000, 2004 and 2008 Olympics. She did not swam at the 2012 Olympics, and retired in 2013.

She attended university and swam for the University of Wisconsin for two years, and then the University of Arkansas (2008-2010), both in the USA.

She was awarded the Malaysian Olympians of the Year in 2008.

References

1984 births
Living people
Malaysian people of Chinese descent
Swimmers at the 2000 Summer Olympics
Swimmers at the 2004 Summer Olympics
Swimmers at the 2008 Summer Olympics
Malaysian female breaststroke swimmers
Olympic swimmers of Malaysia
Arkansas Razorbacks women's swimmers
Wisconsin Badgers women's swimmers
Swimmers at the 2002 Asian Games
Swimmers at the 2006 Asian Games
Commonwealth Games competitors for Malaysia
Swimmers at the 2002 Commonwealth Games
Southeast Asian Games medalists in swimming
Southeast Asian Games gold medalists for Malaysia
Southeast Asian Games silver medalists for Malaysia
Southeast Asian Games bronze medalists for Malaysia
Competitors at the 2001 Southeast Asian Games
Asian Games competitors for Malaysia